"Big C" is a fight song of the University of California, Berkeley. It was composed in 1913 by Harold P. Williams, with lyrics by Norman Loyall McLaren. It was written to commemorate the construction of the large concrete "C" in 1905 on the "rugged Eastern foothills" of the Berkeley campus. The song was the winning entry in the Daily Californian school song competition in 1913. Arrangements of the tune are used by other schools in the University of California system.

Controversy
  
Kelly James, then Associate Director of the UCLA Marching Band and alumnus of the Cal Band wrote an arrangement of "Big C," for a halftime show performed by the combined marching bands from UCLA, UC Davis, and Cal. Afterwards, UCLA continued using James' arrangement of "Big C" as its fight song, adding their own lyrics and renaming it "Sons of Westwood." It was soon adopted as UCLA's fight song.

Many Cal fans, most notably Cal Band director James Berdahl, were enraged over what they saw as James' theft of their song. A bitter exchange ensued between Berdahl and James for the next several years concerning the legal and ethical grounds for James' adaptation of the song. Finally, on February 18, 1969, UCLA lawyers were told by the Copyright Office of the Library of Congress that "Big C" had never been copyrighted, and was therefore in the public domain.  However, whenever Cal plays UCLA and "Sons of Westwood" is played, Cal fans sing a parody ending, "but damn you, it's 'Big C.'"  Likewise, whenever Cal plays "Big C" UCLA plays their signature "tag" at the end, which is a part of "Sons of Westwood" but not "Big C".

Other schools in the University of California system that play the song as one of their official fight songs include University of California, Riverside, University of California, Santa Barbara, University of California, Irvine, and UC Davis. UC Santa Barbara's song mentions that "Cal Poly's men will soon be routed, and their green will turn to red", UC Davis plays a version of the song that mentions Sacramento State, its own rival, saying, "Sac State Sucks! and will be routed." and "We'll stomp them in the mud and their green will turn to blood." Many high schools in California also use one of the arrangements of the tune, including Vacaville High School, Concord High School, Napa High School, Independence High School, Pittsburg High School in Pittsburg, San Ramon Valley High School in Danville, De La Salle High School in Concord, Poway High School in Poway, River City High School in West Sacramento, Moorpark High School in Moorpark, Benicia High School in Benicia, Gonzales High School in Gonzales, California and Orange High School.

Lyrics 
On our rugged eastern foothills 
Stands our symbol clear and bold 
Big C means to fight and strive 
And win for Blue and Gold 
Golden Bear is ever watching 
Day by day he prowls 
And when he hears the tread 
Of lowly Stanfurd red 
From his lair he fiercely growls

Grr-ah! Grr-ah! Grr-rr-rr-ah!

We are sons of California 
Fighting for the Gold and Blue 
Palms of glory we will win 
For Alma Mater true 
Stanfurd's men will soon be routed 
By our dazzling "C" 
And when we serpentine 
Their red will turn to green 
In our hour of victory!

Recordings 
The song has been recorded by the Loftner-Harris St. Francis Hotel Orchestra in October 1931 and also recorded on several albums by the Cal Band, including Big C (1976), California, Here's to Thee (1991), and University of California Band (2003).

See also 
Sons of Westwood

External links
 Cal Band page

University of California, Berkeley
American college songs
College fight songs in the United States
Pac-12 Conference fight songs